Melvin Odoom is a British actor, comedian, television presenter, disc jockey and TV producer. His work on radio has been recognised at the Sony Radio Awards  for the Kiss 100 radio breakfast show (2009-2018), and he has presented BBC Radio 1 Livelounge (2019-2021). On television, he has been involved in presenting Dick and Dom in Da Bungalow (2002-2009), Basil's Swap Shop (2008), the BRIT Awards 2010 and Must Be the Music (2010), The Xtra Factor (2015, Bang on the Money (2016), and MOBO Awards 2016 as well as being a regular guest celebrity on many television shows.

Education
Odoom attended the University of Bedfordshire and studied a Media Performance degree. It was at Luton that Odoom met and lived with Rickie Haywood-Williams.

Career

Radio
Odoom, alongside Rickie Haywood-Williams and Charlie Hedges, hosted Kiss Breakfast every weekday morning 6 - 9am, followed by Kiss Morning Anthems until 10am on Kiss 100. Kiss Breakfast won Silver at the Sony Radio Awards in 2009 within the category of "Breakfast Show Award", and was nominated for the same prize in 2010, finally winning 'Gold' at the event in 2012. Odoom was part of the Kiss Breakfast team for 10 years, stepping down in 2018.

In April 2019, the trio moved to BBC Radio 1 to present the late night show Monday – Thursday from 9 to 11pm, also occasionally covering day time shows. In April 2021, It was announced by Radio 1 that Clara Amfo would be moving to evenings on the station to replace Annie Mac. As part of this reshuffle Melvin, Rickie and Charlie would be taking on the 10:30 – 12:45 show including the live lounge.

Television
Odoom and Rickie Haywood-Williams have presented MTV Digs on MTV One, Monday to Saturday between 4 and 7pm and MTV Music Junkie together — a live studio music show. Odoom presented MTV One's coverage of the BRIT Awards 2010 alongside Haywood-Williams, and also presented coverage of the BAFTA awards alongside Kimberly Walsh for MTV One.

In 2010, Odoom and Haywood-Williams also presented the backstage online content for Sky1's Must Be the Music.

Odoom hosted an MTV Leona Lewis special and presented BBC Blast for BBC Two. Odoom was presenting Basil's Swap Shop with Basil Brush in 2008 on Saturday mornings, alongside his days of playing various characters for the long-running show Dick and Dom in Da Bungalow.

From 2013 until 2015, Odoom was a team captain on the BBC Three comedy panel show Sweat the Small Stuff. In 2014, Odoom and Haywood-Williams presented an episode of The Hot Desk featuring Mark Ronson. Since 2015, Odoom and Haywood-Williams co-hosted ITV2's red carpet show at the BRIT Awards alongside Laura Whitmore.

On 18 June 2015, Odoom and Rochelle Humes were confirmed as the new presenters of The Xtra Factor, replacing Sarah-Jane Crawford. 

Odoom and Haywood-Williams co-presented the Saturday night entertainment series Bang on the Money, which began in April 2016 on ITV.

On 12 August 2016, it was announced that Odoom would take part in the fourteenth series of Strictly Come Dancing, and was partnered with Janette Manrara. The couple were the first to leave the competition having had the fewest public votes. However, Odoom and Manrara went on to win the Strictly Come Dancing Christmas special.

In February 2017, Odoom took part in a celebrity edition of Take Me Out.

In 2017, Odoom and Haywood-Williams took part in Let's Sing and Dance for Comic Relief.

Since 2017, Odoom has hosted the Channel 4 programme Lego Masters, where teams battle to build the best Lego creations.

In 2020, Odoom took part in Richard Osman's House of Games and became the show's first contestant to score a minus point.

Personal life
He is a celebrity ambassador for The Prince's Trust charity, which is involved with helping young adults in life. He is also the brother of actress and writer Yonah Odoom. 

Odoom is not a big follower of football but is a fan of Tottenham Hotspur F.C. and the Ghana national football team.

Filmography
Television

Film

References

External links
 Rickie, Melvin and Charlie (BBC Radio 1)
 Agent - Somethin' Else Talent
 

English people of Ghanaian descent
English radio DJs
English television presenters
Living people
Alumni of the University of Bedfordshire
BBC Radio 1 presenters
Black British television personalities
Kiss Network
Year of birth missing (living people)